The 2010 Women's European Water Polo Championship was the 13th edition of the bi-annual event, organised by the Europe's governing body in aquatics, the Ligue Européenne de Natation. The event took place at the Arena Zagreb in Zagreb, Croatia from August 31 to September 10, 2010.

Teams

Group A

Group B

Preliminary round

Group A

Group B

Quarterfinals

Semifinals

Finals

7th place playoff

5th place playoff

Bronze medal match
All times are CEST (UTC+2).

Gold medal match
All times are CEST (UTC+2).

Final ranking

Team Roster
Evgeniya Protsenko, Nadezda Glyzina, Ekaterina Prokofyeva, Sofia Konukh, Evgenia Pustynnikova, Natalia Ryzhova-Alenicheva, Ekaterina Tankeeva, Evgenia Soboleva, Alexandra Antonova, Olga Belyaeva, Evgeniya Ivanova, Yulia Gaufler, Maria Kovtunovskaya.

Individual awards
Most Valuable Player
Best Goalkeeper
Topscorer

External links 
Official site

Women
2010
International water polo competitions hosted by Croatia
Women's water polo in Croatia
E
W
2010s in Zagreb
Sports competitions in Zagreb
August 2010 sports events in Europe
September 2010 sports events in Europe